Sherman Zavitz is a Canadian historian.

City of Niagara Falls Official Historian

He is the Official Historian of the City of Niagara Falls, Ontario, and has written widely about local Niagara history and made extensive radio broadcasts.

Drawing on his historical knowledge, Zavitz has also served as a tour guide to visitors to Niagara Falls.

Publications

Zavitz's publications include:

Niagara: then and now, (1996)

Niagara at the turn of the century and how it has changed (1996)

It happened at Niagara (1996)

It Seemed As If 100 Men Were Pounding My Head (Grey Borders Books, 2015)

See also

 Niagara Falls#History

References

 
 
 Sherman Zavitz, Grey Borders Books author page 

20th-century Canadian historians
Canadian male non-fiction writers
People from Niagara Falls, Ontario
Living people
Writers from Ontario
Year of birth missing (living people)
21st-century Canadian historians